Donald Maynard Brady (born November 24, 1973) is a former American football and Canadian football cornerback in the National Football League (NFL) and Canadian Football League (CFL). He was signed by the Saskatchewan Roughriders as an undrafted free agent in 1995. He played college football at Wisconsin. He also played High School football at Wellington C. Mepham High School.

Brady also played for the Cleveland Browns, Baltimore Ravens, and Edmonton Eskimos.

External links
http://www.cflapedia.com/Players/b/brady_donny.htm

1973 births
Living people
American football cornerbacks
Baltimore Ravens players
Canadian football defensive backs
Cleveland Browns players
Edmonton Elks players
People from Bellmore, New York
Players of American football from New York (state)
Saskatchewan Roughriders players
Sportspeople from Nassau County, New York
Wisconsin Badgers football players